is a World War II tank simulation game first released in 1999 in Japan by Enterbrain for the PlayStation and Dreamcast game consoles.

Gameplay
Players perform the role of a tank commander during the war using one of six fictional tanks. Battles are fought on various maps based on actual historical campaigns. During the game, the player can engage the enemy while calling in artillery barrages whenever they are available. Panzer Front takes a realistic approach, some enemies can kill the player's tank with one shot. Reinforcements are also available in some missions if allied tanks are lost.

Missions
Panzer Front has 25 missions, based on real events. Examples include the destruction of a British armored column in the Battle of Villers-Bocage, the US Army's defense against a ferocious German counterattack in Le Dezert, the defense of the Reichstag during the Battle of Berlin, and several based on the Battle of Kursk.

Panzer Front bis
Panzer Front bis is an updated version of the original game, released for the Sony PlayStation in Japan on February 8, 2001. Bis (Latin for 'once more') features all of the game's tanks and missions, with additional tanks, ten scenarios (including one set during Operation Olympic), and a mission editor. It was due to be released in Europe in the middle of 2002, but JVC Music Europe, the UK publisher, shut down its video game branch before Bis could be converted and released.

Reception

The PlayStation version received "average" reviews according to the review aggregation website GameRankings. In Japan, Famitsu gave it a score of 30 out of 40 for the Dreamcast version, and 29 out of 40 for the PlayStation version.

See also
Panzer Front Ausf.B

References

External links

http://panzerw.narod.ru/pfload.html

1999 video games
Agetec games
Dreamcast games
Kadokawa Dwango franchises
PlayStation (console) games
Single-player video games
Tank simulation video games
Video games developed in Japan
Video games set in France
Video games set in Germany
Video games set in the Soviet Union
World War II video games